James Mountain Inhofe (born November 17, 1934) is a former American politician who served as a United States senator from Oklahoma from 1994 to 2023. A member of the Republican Party, he is the longest serving U.S. senator from Oklahoma. He served in various elected offices in the state of Oklahoma for nearly sixty years, between 1966 and 2023.

Born in Des Moines, Iowa in 1934, Inhofe moved with his parents to Tulsa, Oklahoma in 1942. His father, Perry Inhofe, was an owner of insurance companies and his mother, Blanche Inhofe (née Mountain), was a Tulsa socialite. Jim was a high school track star and graduated from Central High School. He went on to briefly attend the University of Colorado before finishing his college degree at the University of Tulsa. He was drafted to the United States Army in 1956 and served between 1957 and 1958. He became vice-president of his father's insurance company in 1961 and president after his father's death in 1970.

Inhofe was an elected official representing the Tulsa area for nearly three decades. He represented parts of Tulsa in  the Oklahoma House of Representatives from 1966 to 1969 and the Oklahoma Senate from 1969 to 1977. During his time in the state legislature he was known for feuding with the Democratic Party's state leadership, particularly Governor David Hall and state treasurer Leo Winters, and spearheading the movement to bring the USS Batfish to Oklahoma. While a state senator, he unsuccessfully ran for Governor of Oklahoma in the 1974 election and the U.S. House in 1976. He was elected to three terms as the Mayor of Tulsa, serving between 1978 and 1984. He served in the United States House of Representatives representing  from 1987 to 1994; he resigned after his election to the United States Senate.

Inhofe chaired the U.S. Senate Committee on Environment and Public Works (EPW) from 2003 to 2007 and again from 2015 to 2017. Inhofe served as acting chairman of the Armed Services Committee between December 2017 and September 6, 2018 while John McCain fought cancer. After McCain's death, he became chairman and served until February 3, 2021. From February 3, 2021 to January 3, 2023, he served as Ranking Member of the Senate Armed Services Committee. During his Senate career he was known for his rejection of climate science, his support of constitutional amendments to ban same-sex marriage, and the Inhofe Amendment to make English the national language of the United States.

Family, early life, and education
James Mountain Inhofe was born in Des Moines, Iowa on November 17, 1934, the son of Blanche (née Mountain) and Perry Dyson Inhofe. He moved with his family to Tulsa, Oklahoma after his father became president of the National Mutual Casualty company in August 1942. His father, Perry Inhofe, was educated at Duke University and worked as a lawyer, president of multiple insurance companies, and banker. In 1949 his company, Tri-State, was ordered by the National Labor Relations Board to cease discouraging union membership. His father was also active in the Tulsa Chamber of Commerce and YMCA; and he was the official sponsor of Miss Tulsa and Miss Oklahoma winner Louise O'Brien in 1950. His mother was a Tulsa socialite and hosted guests such as Johnston Murray. 

Inhofe's family had been involved in Oklahoma politics since the 1950's. His father, Perry Inhofe, had served on the executive committee for Democratic Governor Raymond D. Gary's successful 1954 campaign. In 1958, his brother, Perry Jr., ran an unsuccessful campaign for the Oklahoma House of Representatives as a Democrat.

Education, military and business careers
James Inhofe started kindergarten in Des Moines, Iowa, but moved halfway through the year to Hazel Dell in Springfield, Illinois. He skipped first grade after the schoolhouse burned down and started second grade after his family moved to Tulsa at Barnard Elementary School. As a teenager, he would "hire Indians to pick wild blackberries" and then he'd sell them in his neighborhood. He went on to attend Woodrow Wilson Junior High and Tulsa Central High School, where he was a member of his high school's track team. In 1952, his mile relay quartet team broke a school record with a 3:32.6 time. In January 1953, he was elected treasurer of the Brones social club in Tulsa; he graduated from Central High School later that year. He attended the University of Colorado that fall for three months and worked as a bartender. In 1956, he received a draft letter from the United States Army and served from 1957 to 1958. He spent most of his time in the army stationed in Quartermaster Station in Fort Lee, Virginia. In 1961, his father formed a new life insurance company, Quaker Insurance, and Inhofe was the vice-president. On June 17, 1970, Perry Inhofe died of a heart attack; James Inhofe became president of Quaker Life Insurance and vice-president of Mid-Continental Casualty Co. and Oklahoma Surety Co., while his brother Perry Jr. became president of Mid-Continental and Surety and vice-president of Quaker Life.

Inhofe received a B.A. in economics from the University of Tulsa in 1973.

College graduation scandal
Until his 1994 campaign for the U.S. Senate, his official biographies and news articles about him indicated that he had graduated in 1959. Inhofe initially denied the stories that uncovered the discrepancy, but later acknowledged them. After admitting that the stories were true, Inhofe explained that he had been allowed to take part in graduation ceremonies in 1959 though he was a few credits short of completing his degree, and did not finish his coursework until 1973.

State legislative career

Oklahoma House of Representatives
In February 1966, Inhofe launched his first campaign for office as a Republican; he ran for the Oklahoma House of Representatives's 71st district against incumbent Representative Warren Green. He lost the May primary election and then worked on J. Robert Wooten's 1966 lieutenant gubernatorial campaign as the Tulsa County campaign chair. In November 1966, Joe McGraw resigned from the Oklahoma House of Representatives 70th district to run for newly-elected Governor Dewey Bartlett's former state senate seat, triggering a special election. Inhofe was the first to announced his campaign for McGraw's former house seat. He won the Republican primary and the general election. He was sworn in December 29, 1966. During his time in the State House, Inhofe formed a close friendship with Democratic Representative David Boren.

In the Oklahoma House, Inhofe's first successful measure was a bill to allow for personalized license plates in Oklahoma that passed during his first legislative session. During his first term, he spoke against federal regulation at the United States House Committee on Public Works Sub-committee on Roads and voted in favor of an abortion liberalization law. In 1968, he served as the vice-chair of the rules committee for the Oklahoma Republican Party state convention. That May, he announced he would not seek re-election to the Oklahoma House of Representatives and instead would challenge Democrat Beau Selman for his Oklahoma Senate seat in the next election.

Oklahoma Senate

Election, first term, and USS Batfish
After Inhofe had already announced his campaign, Beau Selman announced he would not seek re-election, creating an open seat for the 1968 election. He faced Madison J. Bowers, who was endorsed by the Political Action Committee of Educators, in the Republican primary election. He won the primary and faced Democratic nominee Jerry L. Goodman in the general election. Governor Dewey Bartlett knocked doors with Inhofe during his campaign and he later won the general election. After winning the special election, Republican party officials began considering Inhofe as a potential future U.S. Senate candidate.
In 1969, he was the chairman of the Tulsa County Republican Convention and he supported efforts to liberalize abortions laws in Oklahoma in the 32nd Oklahoma Legislature that passed the Oklahoma House of Representatives, but they failed in Senate committee. Republican party officials tried to recruit Inhofe to run for Treasurer of Oklahoma in 1970, but he declined to run. In 1970, Governor Dewey Bartlett created the Oklahoma Narcotics and Drug Abuse Council and appointed Inhofe as an inaugural member. That November, he was elected minority caucus chair of the Oklahoma Senate for the 33rd Oklahoma Legislature. In 1971, Inhofe served as the chairman of the Oklahoma Republican Party's State Convention. While Inhofe had initially filed a resolution for Oklahoma to ratify the Equal Rights Amendment in 1972, he retracted his support later that year.

USS Batfish

In 1969, Inhofe sponsored a successful bill to bring a retired U.S. Navy submarine to Oklahoma. Inhofe initially wanted the USS Piranha for Tulsa, but it was determined that waters in the Arkansas River were too shallow for the ship to travel that far upriver. Muskogee City-County Trust Port Authority donated five acres of waterfront property to locate the ship in Muskogee. In September 1970, the USS Batfish was considered as an alternative and in on December 9, 1971 the Batfish was given to the State of Oklahoma. The ship was unofficially opened to the public July 4, 1972 with its official opening Memorial Day 1973.

1972 campaigning and second term
In 1972, Inhofe was appointed to serve as co-chair for Richard Nixon's 1972 presidential campaign in Oklahoma with Ralph G. Thompson. During the campaign, Inhofe solicited Barry Goldwater to write a letter of endorsement for Nixon's campaign in Oklahoma to win over conservative Republicans and he represented Oklahoma at the 1972 Republican National Convention. He also worked on U.S. Senator Dewey Bartlett's campaign as the co-chair for Oklahoma's 1st congressional district. In his own district, Inhofe faced no Republican primary challenge and faced Democratic nominee Happy Miles in the general election. He won the general election by over 7,000 votes; afterward, he was elected by fellow Republican State Senators to serve as the assistant floor leader in the 34th Oklahoma Legislature. He was the minority leader of the Oklahoma Senate for the 35th Oklahoma Legislature.

1974 gubernatorial election 

Inhofe had been floated as a potential gubernatorial candidate since 1972. Inhofe was considered a strong Republican candidate with his only weaknesses being his feuding with Leo Winters and the backlash to the USS Batfish project. By May 1973, he was openly campaigning, but had yet to officially announce his campaign. In October of that year, he was polling behind Denzil Garrison in the Republican primary 35% to 65%. Inhofe officially launched his campaign in May 1974. The main issue in both the Republican and Democratic primary campaigns was corruption during David Hall's term. Inhofe defeated Garrison in the August primary. During the campaign, he lost 57 pounds and was down to 148 pounds. 

In a 2011 interview, Inhofe claimed he and David Boren were both upset at incumbent Democratic Governor David Hall, so the pair decided to both campaign against him; Boren would primary him as a Democrat to weaken his campaign and Inhofe would run as the Republican challenger and defeat him. However, the plan was thrown off when Boren won the Democratic nomination. In October, then President Gerald Ford visited Oklahoma to campaign for him. A poll later that month by the Daily Oklahoman showed Democratic State Representative David Boren leading Inhofe 74%–25%. He lost to Boren 64%–36%.

1976 congressional election

In 1976 Inhofe ran for Oklahoma's 1st congressional district. In the Republican primary, he defeated State Senator Frank Keating and Mary Warner, 67%–25%–8%. In a 2011 interview, he credited his primary win to the use of the "Kasten Plan". In the general election, he lost to incumbent Democrat James R. Jones, 54%–45%.

Mayor of Tulsa

In January 1978, the Tulsa Daily World reported Republican party officials were courting Inhofe to run for Mayor of Tulsa. He initially denied he would run for any city office and instead insisted he was considering a rematch against Congressman James R. Jones; but, Inhofe announced his mayor campaign in February. He won the Republican primary with over 92% of the vote, defeating Keith Robinson and Paul Cull. During the first three weeks of the primary, he was injured with a broken leg from a tennis injury and could not campaign. In the general election against Rodger Randle, he was endorsed by then-Mayor Robert LaFortune and U.S. Senator Dewey Bartlett. Randle had won the Democratic primary with a coalition of labor union and black voters; and Inhofe was supported in the general by his Republican base, anti-union and anti-black Democrats, and 22% of black voters. In April, he was elected mayor of Tulsa, defeating Democrat Rodger Randle, 51%–46%. The Tulsa Daily World heralded the race as Inhofe's "first general election victory in six years, and Randle's first election loss since he entered politics in 1970." The race broke then-fundraising records for a Tulsa mayoral election with Randle raising $78,062 and Inhofe raising $48,987. Inhofe's biggest donors were the Metropolitan Builder's Association, oilman Robert L. Parker, and Paul D. Hinch. On May 2, he was sworn in as Mayor of Tulsa. Inhofe's first proclamation as mayor was to celebrate Sun Day and support alternative energy; in the proclamation he said, "I think we're all interested in looking for alternative sources of energy. And of course,  we want clean sources." In his first month in office, he decried the city's reliance on federal funding, promised to "seek minorities to fill positions in city government, and nominated Jewish, senior citizen, anti-abortion, and Christian fundamentalist members to the Tulsa Human Rights Commission. 

In 1980, Inhofe won his mayoral re-election campaign, fending off Democratic nominee Richard Johnson and Independent candidate Robert Murphy.

In 1982 he was reelected with 59% of the vote. He lost his 1984 re-election campaign to Terry Young.

U.S. House of Representatives

Elections
In 1986, when Representative James R. Jones decided to retire to run for the U.S. Senate, Inhofe ran for the 1st District and won the Republican primary with 54%. In the general election, he defeated Democrat Gary Allison 55%–43%. In 1988 he won reelection against Democrat Kurt Glassco, Governor George Nigh's legal counsel, 53%–47%. In 1990 he defeated Glassco again, 56%–44%. After redistricting, the 1st District contained only two counties, all of Tulsa and some parts of Wagoner. In 1992, Inhofe was reelected with 53% of the vote.

Tenure
In 1987 Inhofe voted against President Ronald Reagan's budget, which included tax increases and no increase in defense spending.

He first came to national attention in 1993, when he led the effort to reform the House's discharge petition rule, which the House leadership had long used to bottle up bills in committee.

U.S. Senate

Inhofe served as the longest serving U.S. Senator from Oklahoma serving between 1994 and 2023.

Elections 
In 1994, incumbent Senator David Boren, who had been serving in the Senate since 1979, agreed to become president of the University of Oklahoma and announced he would resign as soon as a successor was elected. Inhofe was elected Boren's successor in an election cycle that saw the Republican Party take both houses of Congress and the Oklahoma governorship. Inhofe took office on November 17, giving him more seniority than the incoming class of senators. After serving the last two years of Boren's term, he won his first full term in 1996. He was reelected in 2002, 2008, 2014, and 2020.

Tenure

Fundraising
In the 2008 election cycle, Inhofe's largest campaign donors represented the oil and gas ($446,900 in donations), leadership PACs ($316,720) and electric utilities ($221,654) industries/categories. In 2010, his largest donors represented the oil and gas ($429,950) and electric ($206,654) utilities.

The primary PACs donating to his campaigns were Aircraft Owners & Pilots Association  ($55,869), United Parcel Service ($51,850), National Association of Realtors ($51,700), National Rifle Association ($51,050) and American Medical Association ($51,000). Additionally, if company-sponsored PACs were combined with employee contributions, Koch Industries would be Inhofe's largest contributor, with $90,950 according to OpenSecrets.

Armed Services Committee

As a member of the Armed Services Committee, Inhofe was among the panelists questioning witnesses about the 2004 Abu Ghraib prisoner abuse, saying he was "outraged by the outrage" over the revelations of abuse. Although he believed that the individuals responsible for mistreating prisoners should be punished, he said that the prisoners "are not there for traffic violations ... they're murderers, they're terrorists, they're insurgents". In 2006, Inhofe was one of only nine senators to vote against the Detainee Treatment Act of 2005, which prohibits "cruel, inhuman or degrading" treatment of individuals in U.S. Government custody.
 
When chairman of the Senate Armed Services Committee John McCain was absent seeking medical treatment for brain cancer, Inhofe became acting chairman of the committee. During this time, Inhofe helped secure the passage of the record $716 billion National Defense Authorization Act for Fiscal Year 2019. McCain died in August 2018, and Inhofe lauded him as his "hero".
Inhofe also said that McCain was "partially to blame for" the White House's controversial decision to raise flags back to full mast after less than two days, as McCain previously "disagreed with the President in certain areas and wasn't too courteous about it".

On March 6, 2019, Inhofe said he intended to put language in the next defense authorization act to reinforce Trump's decision to withdraw from the Iran nuclear agreement and reintroduce severe sanctions on Tehran.

Committee assignments and Caucus membership

During the 115th, 116th, and 117th Congresses, Inhofe was a member of the following committees:
 Committee on Armed Services
 Subcommittee on Airland
 Subcommittee on Readiness and Management Support
 Subcommittee on Strategic Forces
 Committee on Commerce, Science, and Transportation
 Committee on Environment and Public Works
 Committee on Small Business and Entrepreneurship

Caucus memberships

 International Conservation Caucus
 Senate Army Caucus
 Senate Diabetes Caucus
 Senate General Aviation Caucus
 Senate Rural Health Caucus
 Senate Tourism Caucus
 Sportsmen's Caucus

Retirement
On July 15, 2021, Inhofe told Tulsa World he planned to retire at the end of his current term, in 2027. In February 2022, The New York Times reported that Inhofe was planning to resign at the end of the 117th Congress. A special election for Inhofe's replace was held in 2022 while he remained in office. He endorsed his former chief of staff, Luke Holland, in the special election. Oklahoma's 2nd congressional district Congressman Markwayne Mullin won the Republican primary and the special election. Inhofe resigned on January 3, 2023. It was reported in February 2023 that the primary reason for Inhofe's retirement was related to him suffering symptoms of long COVID, which had severely limited his capacity to do day-to-day activities, after an initial infection he had described as "very mild".

Political positions

Inhofe was ranked the most conservative member of Congress on the 2017 GovTrack report card. He received the same ranking for 2018. For 2019, he was ranked as the fifth-most conservative member of the U.S. Senate with a score of 0.91 out of 1, behind Marsha Blackburn (R-TN), Joni Ernst (R-IA), Mike Braun (R-IN), and Ted Cruz (R-TX).

Environmental issues

Early years; 2003 Chair of Environment and Public Works committee 
In December 1997, Inhofe argued that the Kyoto Protocol was a "political, economic, and national security fiasco."

Before the Republicans regained control of the Senate in the November 2002 elections, Inhofe had compared the United States Environmental Protection Agency to a Gestapo bureaucracy, and EPA Administrator Carol Browner to a Tokyo Rose, i.e. an English-speaking spreader of Japanese propaganda during World War II. In January 2003, he became Chair of the Senate Committee on Environment and Public Works, and continued challenging mainstream science in favor of what he called "sound science", in accordance with the Luntz memo.

Climate change denial 
Since 2003, when he was first elected Chair of the Senate Committee on Environment and Public Works, Inhofe was the foremost Republican promoting climate change denial. He famously claimed in the Senate that global warming is a hoax, invited contrarians to testify in Committee hearings, and spread his views via the Committee website run by Marc Morano as well as through his access to conservative media. In 2012, Inhofe's The Greatest Hoax: How the Global Warming Conspiracy Threatens Your Future was published by WorldNetDaily Books, presenting his global warming conspiracy theory. He has said that, because "God's still up there", the "arrogance of people to think that we, human beings, would be able to change what He is doing in the climate is to me outrageous", but also that he appreciates that this argument is unpersuasive, and that he has "never pointed to Scriptures in a debate, because I know this would discredit me."

As Environment and Public Works chairman, Inhofe gave a two-hour Senate floor speech on July 28, 2003, in the context of discussions on the McCain-Lieberman Bill. He said he was "going to expose the most powerful, most highly financed lobby in Washington, the far left environmental extremists", and laid out in detail his opposition to attribution of recent climate change to humans, using the word "hoax" four times, including the statement that he had "offered compelling evidence that catastrophic global warming is a hoax" and his conclusion that "manmade global warming is the greatest hoax ever perpetrated on the American people". He supported what he called "sound science", citing contrarian scientists such as Patrick Michaels, Fred Singer, Richard Lindzen and Sallie Baliunas as well as some mainstream scientists. Two of these, Tom Wigley and Stephen Schneider, later issued statements that Inhofe had misrepresented their work.

On July 29, the day after his Senate speech, Inhofe chaired an Environment and Public Works hearing with contrarian views represented by Baliunas and David Legates, and praised their "1,000-year climate study", then involved in the Soon and Baliunas controversy, as "a powerful new work of science". Against them, Michael E. Mann defended mainstream science and specifically his work on reconstructions (the hockey stick graph) that they and the Bush administration disputed. During the hearing Senator Jim Jeffords read out an email from Hans von Storch saying he had resigned as editor-in-chief of the journal that published the Soon and Baliunas paper, as the peer review had "failed to detect significant methodological flaws in the paper" and the critique by Mann and colleagues was valid.

In a continuation of these themes, Inhofe had a 20-page brochure published under the Seal of the United States Senate reiterating his "hoax" statement and comparing the Intergovernmental Panel on Climate Change (IPCC) to a "Soviet style trial". In a section headed "The IPCC Plays Hockey" he attacked what he called "Mann's flawed, limited research." The brochure restated themes from Inhofe's Senate speech, and in December 2003 he distributed copies of it in Milan at a meeting about the United Nations Framework Convention on Climate Change, where he met "green activists" with posters quoting him as saying that global warming "is the greatest hoax ever perpetrated on the American people". He signed a poster for them, and thanked them for quoting him correctly. In an October 2004 Senate speech he said, "Global warming is the greatest hoax ever perpetrated on the American people. It was true when I said it before, and it remains true today. Perhaps what has made this hoax so effective is that we hear over and over that the science is settled and there is a consensus that, unless we fundamentally change our way of life by limiting greenhouse gas emissions, we will cause catastrophic global warming. This is simply a false statement." In January 2005 Inhofe told Bloomberg News that global warming was "the second-largest hoax ever played on the American people, after the separation of church and state", and that carbon dioxide would not be restricted by the Clear Skies Act of 2003. In a Senate Floor "update", he extended his argument against Mann's work by extensively citing Michael Crichton's fictional thriller State of Fear, mistakenly describing Crichton as a "scientist". On August 28, 2005, at Inhofe's invitation, Crichton appeared as an expert witness at a hearing on climate change, disputing Mann's work.

In his 2006 book The Republican War on Science, Chris Mooney wrote that Inhofe "politicizes and misuses the science of climate change".

During the 2006 North American heat wave, Inhofe said that the environmentalist movement reminded him of "the Third Reich, the Big Lie": "You say something over and over and over and over again, and people will believe it, and that's their strategy."
In a September 2006 Senate speech Inhofe argued that the threat of global warming was exaggerated by "the media, Hollywood elites and our pop culture". He said that in the 1960s the media had switched from warning of global warming to warning of global cooling and a coming ice age, then in the 1970s had returned to warming to promote "climate change fears". In February 2007 he told Fox News that mainstream science increasingly attributed climate change to natural causes, and only "those individuals on the far left, such as Hollywood liberals and the United Nations", disagreed.

In 2006, Inhofe introduced Senate Amendment 4682 with Kit Bond (R-MO), which would have modified oversight responsibility of the Army Corps of Engineers. The League of Conservation Voters, an environmentalist group, said analyses for corps projects "have been manipulated to favor large-scale projects that harm the environment." During the 109th Congress, Inhofe voted to increase offshore oil drilling, to include provisions for drilling in the Arctic National Wildlife Refuge in the House Budget Amendment, and to deny funding for both low-income energy assistance and environmental stewardship, citing heavy costs and unproven programs.

In May 2009, Inhofe gave support to the idea that black carbon is a significant contributor to global warming.

Inhofe has received money from the fossil fuel industry. For example: "Exxon's beneficiaries in Congress include the Oklahoma senator Jim Inhofe, who called global warming a hoax, and who has received $20,500 since 2007, according to the Dirty Energy Money database maintained by Oil Change International."

Climatic Research Unit email controversy 
On November 23, 2009, as the Climatic Research Unit email controversy emerged, Inhofe said the emails confirmed his view that scientists were "cooking the science". On December 7 on the CNN program The Situation Room, Inhofe said that the emails showed that the science behind climate change "has been pretty well debunked"; the fact checking organization PolitiFact concluded that Inhofe's statement was false. On the same day, Inhofe said he would lead a three-man "truth squad" consisting of himself and fellow senators Roger Wicker and John Barrasso to the 2009 United Nations Climate Change Conference in Copenhagen. Inhofe was unable to secure meetings with any negotiators or delegations to the conference and only met with a small group of reporters. The minority group of the Senate Committee on Environment and Public Works prepared a report on "the CRU Controversy", published in February 2010, which listed as "Key Players" 17 scientists including Mann and Phil Jones. Inhofe said it showed that the controversy was "about unethical and potentially illegal behavior by some of the world's leading climate scientists." On May 26 Inhofe formally requested that the Inspector General of the United States Department of Commerce investigate how the National Oceanic and Atmospheric Administration (NOAA) had dealt with the emails, and whether the emails showed any wrongdoing; it found no major issues or inappropriate actions.

Global warming temperatures 
In July 2010 Inhofe said, "I don't think that anyone disagrees with the fact that we actually are in a cold period that started about nine years ago. Now, that's not me talking, those are the scientists that say that." The Union of Concerned Scientists said that Inhofe was wrong, pointing to a NOAA report indicating that the summer of 2010 had so far been the hottest on record since 1880. Inhofe added, "People on the other side of this argument back in January, they said, 'Inhofe, it has nothing to do with today's or this month or next month. We're looking at a long period of time. We go into twenty year periods.'"

During a House committee hearing in 2011, Inhofe testified, "I have to admit—and, you know, confession is good for the soul ... I, too, once thought that catastrophic global warming was caused by anthropogenic gases—because everyone said it was." Under questioning from committee member Jay Inslee, Inhofe dismissed the notion that he was less knowledgeable than climate scientists, saying that he'd already given "five speeches on the science."

2015: Chair of Environment and Public Works committee 

On January 21, 2015, Inhofe returned to chairing the Senate Committee on Environment and Public Works as part of a new Republican majority in the Senate. In response to NOAA and NASA reports that 2014 had been the warmest year globally in the temperature record, he said, "we had the coldest in the western hemisphere in the same time frame", and attributed changes to a 30-year cycle, not human activities. In a debate on the same day about a bill for the Keystone XL pipeline, Inhofe endorsed an amendment proposed by Senator Sheldon Whitehouse, "Climate change is real and not a hoax", which passed 98–1. Inhofe clarified his view that "Climate is changing and climate has always changed and always will. There is archaeological evidence of that, there is biblical evidence of that, there is historical evidence of that", but added, "there are some people who are so arrogant to think they are so powerful they can change climate."

On February 26, 2015, Inhofe brought a snowball to the Senate floor and tossed it before delivering remarks in which he said that environmentalists keep talking about global warming even though it keeps getting cold.

Hydraulic fracturing 
On March 19, 2015, Inhofe introduced S.828, "The Fracturing Regulations are Effective in State Hands (FRESH) Act." The bill would transfer regulatory power over hydraulic fracturing from the federal government to state governments. In his announcement of the bill, Inhofe said that hydraulic fracturing has never contaminated ground water in Oklahoma. The U.S. senators from seven states (Arkansas, Idaho, Kentucky, Louisiana, South Dakota and Texas) cosponsored the bill.

Paris Agreement 
Inhofe co-authored and was one of 22 senators to sign a letter to President Donald Trump urging him to withdraw the United States from the Paris Agreement. According to OpenSecrets, Inhofe has received over $529,000 from the oil and gas industry since 2012.

Foreign policy

Israel Anti-Boycott Act 
In October 2017, Inhofe co-sponsored the Israel Anti-Boycott Act (s. 720), which would have made it a federal crime for Americans to encourage or participate in boycotts against Israel and Israeli settlements in the occupied Palestinian territories if protesting actions by the Israeli government.

Western Sahara 
Inhofe has long supported the Polisario Front and has traveled to Algeria many times to meet with its leaders. He has urged Morocco to hold a referendum on Western Saharan independence. In 2017, Inhofe blocked the Trump administration's nomination of J. Peter Pham for Assistant Secretary of State for African Affairs, citing a disagreement over Western Sahara.

After the December 2020 Israel–Morocco normalization agreement, Inhofe sharply criticized the Trump administration for recognizing Morocco's claim over Western Sahara, calling the decision "shocking and deeply disappointing" and adding that he was "saddened that the rights of the Western Sahara people have been traded away".

War in Afghanistan 
Inhofe opposed the 2021 withdrawal of U.S. troops from Afghanistan under President Biden, saying that Biden should maintain "a relatively small troop presence until the conditions outlined in the 2020 U.S.-Taliban Agreement are fully implemented."

Immigration
Inhofe wrote the Inhofe Amendment to the Comprehensive Immigration Reform Act of 2006, which was debated in Congress in May 2006. The amendment would make English the national language of the United States and require that new citizens take an English proficiency test. The amendment was passed on May 18, 2006, with 32 Democrats, one independent, and one Republican dissenting. The measure had 11 cosponsors, including one Democrat.

Social issues

Gun policy
In the aftermath of the 2017 Las Vegas shooting, Inhofe blamed the "culture of sanctuary cities" for the shootings.

LGBT rights

Inhofe has generally been seen as overtly hostile by LGBT advocacy groups, earning a 0% in every one of his terms on Human Rights Campaign's position scorecard. Inhofe is in favor of a constitutional amendment banning same-sex marriage, against adding sexual orientation to the definition of hate crimes, and voted against prohibiting job discrimination on the basis of sexual orientation. In 2008, Inhofe said his office "does not hire openly gay staffers due to the possibility of a conflict of agenda."

Inhofe campaigned for his Senate seat in 1994 using the phrase "God, guns, and gays." In 2008, his campaign was noted by the Associated Press for running an ad with "anti-gay overtones" featuring a wedding cake with two male figures on top, fading into his opponent's face.

In 1999, along with Republican colleagues Tim Hutchinson and Bob Smith, and Republican Senate Majority Leader Trent Lott, Inhofe stalled the nomination of James Hormel, a gay man, as US Ambassador to Luxembourg for over 20 months specifically because of Hormel's sexual orientation. President Bill Clinton eventually appointed him in a recess appointment, making him the United States' first openly gay ambassador in June 1999, and angering Inhofe, who held up seven more Clinton appointees in retaliation.

In 2015, Inhofe condemned the Supreme Court ruling in Obergefell v. Hodges, which held that same-sex marriage bans violated the constitution.

Racial and gender civil rights
In 1995, Inhofe voted to ban affirmative action hiring with federal funds. In 1997, he voted to end special funding for minority- and women-owned businesses. The bill he voted for would have abolished a program that helps businesses owned by women and minorities to compete for federally funded transportation; it did not pass. The next year, Inhofe voted to repeal the Disadvantaged Business Enterprise Program, which is designed to "remedy ongoing discrimination and the continuing effects of past discrimination in federally-assisted highway, transit, airport, and highway safety financial assistance transportation contracting markets nationwide" by allocating 10% of highway funds to benefit the business enterprises of racial minorities and women.

Overall, in 2002, the American Civil Liberties Union (ACLU) rated Inhofe at 20%, indicating that he has an anti-racial civil rights record. Four years later, on December 31, 2006, the National Association for the Advancement of Colored People (NAACP) rated Inhofe at 7%, indicating that he has an anti-civil rights and anti-affirmative action record.

Privacy
In 2001, Inhofe voted to loosen restrictions on cell phone wiretapping. The bill, which passed, removed the requirement that a person or party implementing an order to wiretap a private citizen's cellphone must ascertain that the target of the surveillance is present in the house or using the phone that has been tapped.

Free speech and expression
In 1995, Inhofe co-sponsored a constitutional amendment to the U.S. Constitution that would give Congress and individual U.S. states the power to prohibit the physical desecration of the American flag. The bill's primary sponsor was Orrin Hatch (R-UT).

GI Bill reform
Inhofe, an initial sponsor of Senator Jim Webb's Post-9/11 Veterans Educational Assistance Act of 2008, subsequently withdrew support for this bill to support S 2938, a competing bill that would have provided benefits beyond those offered in Webb's bill. But he voted to enact Webb's legislation in June 2008.

Inhofe agreed to support legislation allowing military mental health specialists to talk with veterans about private firearms in an effort to reduce suicides.

Economic issues

Aviation
Trained by the U.S. Navy, Inhofe was one of the few members of Congress holding a Commercial Airman certificate. In 1994, when he first ran for the U.S. Senate, he used his plane as a daily campaign vehicle to travel throughout Oklahoma and visit almost every town in the state. He was influential in Senate and Congressional debates involving aircraft regulation. In 2012, he authored the Pilot's Bill of Rights bill.

Taxpayer-funded travel
Inhofe has said that he has made over 140 trips to Africa over about 20 years and helped to get United States Africa Command established. He has made multiple foreign trips, especially to Africa, on missions that he described as "a Jesus thing" and that were paid for by the U.S. government. He has used these trips for activities on behalf of The Fellowship, a Christian organization. Inhofe has said that his trips included some governmental work but also involved "the political philosophy of Jesus, something that had been put together by Doug Coe, the leader of The Fellowship ... It's all scripturally based." Inhofe used his access as a Senator to pursue religious goals.

Federal disaster relief
Inhofe consistently voted against federal disaster relief, most notably in the case of relief for the 24 states affected by Hurricane Sandy, but argued for federal aid when natural disasters hit Oklahoma. In defense of his decision to vote against a relief fund for Sandy but not in Oklahoma after tornadoes ravaged it in May 2013, he claimed the situations were "totally different", in that the Sandy funding involved "Everybody getting in and exploiting the tragedy that took place. That won't happen in Oklahoma." Inhofe pointedly did not thank President Obama for his attention to the tragedy in his state, so as to not be compared to Chris Christie.

Earmarks 
In April 2021, Inhofe expressed support for bringing back earmarks to the United States Senate.

Presidential Impeachments
On February 12, 1999, Inhofe was one of 50 senators to vote to convict and remove Bill Clinton from office. On February 5, 2020, he voted to acquit Donald Trump and on February 13, 2021, he voted to acquit Trump for the second time.

2016 presidential election
Early during the Republican Party presidential primaries in 2016, Inhofe endorsed fellow Republican John Kasich. During Donald Trump's presidency, he voted in line with Trump's position 94.2% of the time.

Purchase of Raytheon stock 

In December 2018, Inhofe bought $50,000 to $100,000 worth of stock in Raytheon, a major defense contractor that has billions of dollars' worth of contracts with the Pentagon. The week before, he had successfully lobbied the Trump administration to increase military spending. Ethics watchdogs said the purchase raised conflict of interest concerns, and noted that members of Congress are not allowed to purchase stocks on the basis of information that is not publicly available. Inhofe sold the stock shortly after reporters asked him about the purchase. He said the purchase was made by a third-party adviser who manages Inhofe's investments on his behalf.

Judiciary 

In March 2016, around seven months before the next presidential election, Inhofe argued that the Senate should not consider Obama's Supreme Court nominee because "we must let the people decide the Supreme Court's future" via the presidential election. In September 2020, less than two months before the next presidential election, Inhofe supported an immediate vote on Trump's nominee to fill the Supreme Court vacancy caused by Justice Ruth Bader Ginsburg's death.

Inhofe also voted to confirm Neil Gorsuch and Brett Kavanaugh (Trump's other two Supreme Court nominations) while voting against Sonia Sotomayor and Elena Kagan (Obama's two Supreme Court nominations). All four were successful.

2021 storming of the United States Capitol
On May 28, 2021, Inhofe abstained from voting on the creation of an independent commission to investigate the January 6 United States Capitol attack.

Personal life

On December 19, 1959, Inhofe married Kay Kirkpatrick, with whom he has had four children. On November 10, 2013, one of Inhofe's son, Perry Inhofe, died in a plane crash in Owasso, Oklahoma, flying alone for the first time since training in a newly acquired Mitsubishi MU-2.

Inhofe has had his pilot's license since he was 28. He flies a Van's Aircraft RV-8. He has attended the EAA AirVenture Oshkosh for 20 years; in 2021, he said, "I've slept in the same tent for 20 years. If you're not sleeping in a tent, it's not like being at Oshkosh." He's has had to emergency land his plane multiple times throughout his career.

Inhofe was the first recipient of the U.S. Air Force Academy's Character and Leadership Award for his character and leadership in public service.

Inhofe has symptoms of long COVID, which have severely limited his capacity to do day-to-day activities.

Electoral history

Oklahoma House

Oklahoma Senator

Oklahoma governor

1976 U.S. House

Tulsa mayor

U.S. Representative

U.S. Senator

See also 
 Politics of Oklahoma
 List of United States senators from Oklahoma
 2020 Congressional insider trading scandal

Notes

References

Sources

External links 

 
 
 
 Inhofe, James Mountain entry in The Encyclopedia of Oklahoma History and Culture

|-

|-

|-

|-

|-

|-

|-

|-

|-

|-

|-

1934 births
20th-century American politicians
20th-century Presbyterians
21st-century American politicians
21st-century Presbyterians
American businesspeople in insurance
American Christian Zionists
American conspiracy theorists
American Presbyterians
Aviators from Iowa
Aviators from Oklahoma
Candidates in the 1966 United States elections
Candidates in the 1974 United States elections
Candidates in the 1976 United States elections
Central High School (Tulsa, Oklahoma) alumni
Living people
Mayors of Tulsa, Oklahoma
Military personnel from Oklahoma
Politicians from Des Moines, Iowa
Politicians from Tulsa, Oklahoma
Protestants from Oklahoma
Republican Party members of the Oklahoma House of Representatives
Republican Party members of the United States House of Representatives from Oklahoma
Republican Party Oklahoma state senators
Republican Party United States senators from Oklahoma
United States Army personnel
University of Tulsa alumni